La Gran Fuga (The Great Escape) is an album of Willie Colón & Héctor Lavoe issued in 1971 by Fania Records. It was the second of Colón and Lavoe's records to go gold, after Cosa Nuestra (1970) and before El Juicio (1972).

Track listing
"Ghana' E" (Willie Colón & Héctor Lavoe) – 4:01
"Pa' Colombia" (C. Curet Alonso) – 5:47
"No Cambiare" (Willie Colón & Héctor Lavoe) – 3:37
"Sigue Feliz" (Carlos Román) – 4:12
"Barrunto" (C. Curet Alonso) – 5:52
"Abuelita" (Willie Colón & Héctor Lavoe) – 4:21
"Panameña" (Willie Colón & Héctor Lavoe) – 6:36
"Canción Para Mi Suegra" – 0:55

References

1971 albums
Willie Colón albums
Héctor Lavoe albums